

Team 
In accordance with Olympic qualification procedure, the top 24 nations in team competition qualified to send a full team to the 2011 World Championships.

Individual all-around

Individual Event Finals

Vault

Uneven bars

Balance beam

Floor exercise

2010 World Artistic Gymnastics Championships
2010 in women's gymnastics